Suisun may refer to:

People
Suisun people

Places
Suisun Bay
Suisun City, California
Suisun–Fairfield station
Suisun Marsh
Suisun Valley AVA, wine region

Ships
USS Suisun